In atomic physics, the spin quantum number is a quantum number (designated ) which describes the intrinsic angular momentum (or spin angular momentum, or simply spin) of an electron or other particle. The phrase was originally used to describe the fourth of a set of quantum numbers (the principal quantum number , the azimuthal quantum number , the magnetic quantum number , and the spin quantum number ), which completely describe the quantum state of an electron in an atom. The name comes from a physical spinning of the electron about an axis, as proposed by Uhlenbeck and Goudsmit.

However this simplistic picture was quickly realized to be physically impossible because it would require the electrons to rotate faster than the speed of light. It was therefore replaced by a more abstract quantum-mechanical description. However  is always +1/2 for an electron, so it is not necessary to include its value in the set of quantum numbers describing the state of each electron in an atom.

Key points 

 Quantum numbers give complete information about the electron in an atom, i.e., energy, position, size, shape and orientation of that orbital and the direction of spin. The direction of spin is described by spin quantum number.
 The electron in an atom not only moves around the nucleus, but also spins about its own axis. This number gives the information about the direction of spinning of the electron present in any orbital.
 The spin angular momentum is an intrinsic property, like rest mass and charge.
 The magnitude spin quantum number of an electron cannot be changed.
 The spin may lie in 2s+1=2 orientation.
 Each type of subatomic particle has fixed spin quantum numbers like 0,1/2, 1, 3/2, ... etc.
 The spin value of an electron, proton, neutron is 1/2. 
 The particles having half integral value (1/2, 3/2 ...) of spin are called fermions. 
 The particles having integral value (0,1,2..) of spin are called bosons.

Magnetic nature of atoms and molecules 

The spin quantum number helps to explain the magnetic properties of atoms and molecules. A spinning electron behaves like a micromagnet with a definite magnetic moment. If an atomic or molecular orbital contains two electrons, then their magnetic moments oppose and cancel each other.

If all orbitals are doubly occupied by electrons, the net magnetic moment is zero and the substance behaves as diamagnetic; it is repelled by the external magnetic field. If some orbitals are half filled (singly occupied), the substance has a net magnetic moment and is paramagnetic; it is attracted by the external magnetic field.

History 
Early attempts to explain the behavior of electrons in atoms focused on solving the Schrödinger wave equation for the hydrogen atom, the simplest possible case, with a single electron bound to the atomic nucleus.  This was successful in explaining many features of atomic spectra.

The solutions required each possible state of the electron to be described by three "quantum numbers". These were identified as, respectively, the electron "shell" number , the "orbital" number , and the "orbital angular momentum" number . Angular momentum is a so-called "classical" concept measuring the momentum of a mass in circular motion about a point. The shell numbers start at 1 and increase indefinitely. Each shell of number  contains  orbitals. By means of a variety of approximations and extensions, physicists were able to extend their work on hydrogen to more complex atoms containing many electrons.

The so-called "Transition rule" limits what "jumps" are possible. In general, a jump or "transition" is allowed only if all three numbers change in the process. This is because a transition will be able to cause the emission or absorption of electromagnetic radiation only if it involves a change in the electromagnetic dipole of the atom.

In January 1925, when Ralph Kronig was still a Columbia University PhD student, he first proposed electron spin after hearing Wolfgang Pauli in Tübingen. Werner Heisenberg and Pauli immediately hated the idea. They had just ruled out all imaginable actions from quantum mechanics. Now Kronig was proposing to set the electron rotating in space. Pauli especially ridiculed the idea of spin, saying that "it is indeed very clever but of course has nothing to do with reality". Faced with such criticism, Kronig decided not to publish his theory and the idea of electron spin had to wait for others to take the credit. Ralph Kronig had come up with the idea of electron spin several months before George Uhlenbeck and Samuel Goudsmit. Most textbooks credit these two Dutch physicists with the discovery.

Pauli subsequently proposed (also in 1925) a new quantum degree of freedom (or quantum number) with two possible values, in order to resolve inconsistencies between observed molecular spectra and the developing theory of quantum mechanics.

Shortly thereafter Uhlenbeck and Goudsmit identified Pauli's new degree of freedom as electron spin.

Electron spin

A spin-1/2 particle is characterized by an angular momentum quantum number for spin s of 1/2. In solutions of the Schrödinger-Pauli equation, angular momentum is quantized according to this number, so that total spin angular momentum

The hydrogen spectrum fine structure is observed as a doublet corresponding to two possibilities for the z-component of the angular momentum, where for any given direction z:

whose solution has only two possible z-components for the electron.  In the electron, the two different spin orientations are sometimes called "spin-up" or "spin-down".

The spin property of an electron would give rise to magnetic moment, which was a requisite for the fourth quantum number. The electron spin magnetic moment is given by the formula:

where
 is the charge of the electron
 is the Landé g-factor
and by the equation:

where  is the Bohr magneton.

When atoms have even numbers of electrons the spin of each electron in each orbital has opposing orientation to that of its immediate neighbor(s). However, many atoms have an odd number of electrons or an arrangement of electrons in which there is an unequal number of "spin-up" and "spin-down" orientations. These atoms or electrons are said to have unpaired spins that are detected in electron spin resonance.

Detection of spin 
When lines of the hydrogen spectrum are examined at very high resolution, they are found to be closely spaced doublets. This splitting is called fine structure, and was one of the first experimental evidences for electron spin. The direct observation of the electron's intrinsic angular momentum was achieved in the Stern–Gerlach experiment.

Stern–Gerlach experiment 
The theory of spatial quantization of the spin moment of the momentum of electrons of atoms situated in the magnetic field needed to be proved experimentally. In 1920 (two years before the theoretical description of the spin was created) Otto Stern and Walter Gerlach observed it in the experiment they conducted.

Silver atoms were evaporated using an electric furnace in a vacuum. Using thin slits, the atoms were guided into a flat beam and the beam sent through an in-homogeneous magnetic field before colliding with a metallic plate. The laws of classical  physics predict that the collection of condensed silver atoms on the plate should form a thin solid line in the same shape as the original beam. However, the in-homogeneous magnetic field caused the beam to split in two separate directions, creating two lines on the metallic plate.

The phenomenon can be explained with the spatial quantization of the spin moment of momentum. In atoms the electrons are paired such that one spins upward and one downward, neutralizing the effect of their spin on the action of the atom as a whole. But in the valence shell of silver atoms, there is a single electron whose spin remains unbalanced.

The unbalanced spin creates spin magnetic moment, making the electron act like a very small magnet. As the atoms pass through the in-homogeneous magnetic field, the force moment in the magnetic field influences the electron's dipole until its position matches the direction of the stronger field. The atom would then be pulled toward or away from the stronger magnetic field a specific amount, depending on the value of the valence electron's spin. When the spin of the electron is +1/2 the atom moves away from the stronger field, and when the spin is −1/2 the atom moves toward it. Thus the beam of silver atoms is split while traveling through the in-homogeneous magnetic field, according to the spin of each atom's valence electron.

In 1927 Phipps and Taylor conducted a similar experiment, using atoms of hydrogen with similar results.  Later scientists conducted experiments using other atoms that have only one electron in their valence shell: (copper, gold, sodium, potassium). Every time there were two lines formed on the metallic plate.

The atomic nucleus also may have spin, but protons and neutrons are much heavier than electrons (about 1836 times), and the magnetic dipole moment is inversely proportional to the mass. So the nuclear magnetic dipole momentum is much smaller than that of the whole atom. This small magnetic dipole was later measured by Stern, Frisch and Easterman.

Electron paramagnetic resonance
For atoms or molecules with an unpaired electron, transitions in a magnetic field can also be observed in which only the spin quantum number changes, without change in the electron orbital or the other quantum numbers. This is the method of electron paramagnetic resonance (EPR) or electron spin resonance (ESR), used to study free radicals. Since only the magnetic interaction of the spin changes, the energy change is much smaller than for transitions between orbitals, and the spectra are observed in the microwave region.

Derivation 
For a solution of either the nonrelativistic Pauli equation or the relativistic Dirac equation, the quantized angular momentum (see angular momentum quantum number) can be written as:

where
  is the quantized spin vector or spinor
  is the norm of the spin vector
  is the spin quantum number associated with the spin angular momentum
  is the reduced Planck constant.

Given an arbitrary direction z (usually determined by an external magnetic field) the spin z-projection is given by

where  is the secondary spin quantum number, ranging from − to + in steps of one.

The allowed values for s are non-negative integers or half-integers. Fermions have half-integer values, including the electron, proton and neutron which all have s = 1/2. Bosons such as the photon and all mesons) have integer spin values.

Algebra 
The algebraic theory of spin is a carbon copy of the angular momentum in quantum mechanics theory.
First of all, spin satisfies the fundamental commutation relation:

where  is the (antisymmetric) Levi-Civita symbol. This means that it is impossible to know two coordinates of the spin at the same time because of the restriction of the uncertainty principle.

where  are the creation and annihilation (or "raising" and "lowering" or "up" and "down") operators.

Energy levels from the Dirac equation 

In 1928, Paul Dirac developed a relativistic wave equation, now termed the Dirac equation, which predicted the spin magnetic moment correctly, and at the same time treated the electron as a point-like particle. Solving the Dirac equation for the energy levels of an electron in the hydrogen atom, all four quantum numbers including  occurred naturally and agreed well with experiment.

Total spin of an atom or molecule 

For some atoms the spins of several unpaired electrons (s1, s2, ...) are coupled to form a total spin quantum number S. This occurs especially in light atoms (or in molecules formed only of light atoms) when spin–orbit coupling is weak compared to the coupling between spins or the coupling between orbital angular momenta, a situation known as LS coupling because L and S are constants of motion. Here L is the total orbital angular momentum quantum number.

For atoms with a well-defined S, the multiplicity of a state is defined as (2S+1). This is equal to the number of different possible values of the total (orbital plus spin) angular momentum J for a given (L, S) combination, provided that S ≤ L (the typical case). For example, if S = 1, there are three states which form a triplet. The eigenvalues of Sz for these three states are +1ħ, 0 and -1ħ. The term symbol of an atomic state indicates its values of L, S, and J.

As examples, the ground states of both the oxygen atom and the dioxygen molecule have two unpaired electrons and are therefore triplet states. The atomic state is described by the term symbol 3P, and the molecular state by the term symbol 3Σ.

Nuclear spin
Atomic nuclei also have spins. The nuclear spin  is a fixed property of each nucleus and may be either an integer or a half-integer. The component  of nuclear spin parallel to the –axis can have (2 + 1) values , –1, ..., . For example, a 14N nucleus has  = 1, so that there are 3 possible orientations relative to the –axis, corresponding to states  = +1, 0 and −1.

The spins  of different nuclei are interpreted using the nuclear shell model. Even-even nuclei with even numbers of both protons and neutrons, such as 12C and 16O, have spin zero. Odd mass number nuclei have half-integral spins, such as 3/2 for 7Li, 1/2 for 13C and 5/2 for 17O, usually corresponding to the angular momentum of the last nucleon added. Odd-odd nuclei with odd numbers of both protons and neutrons have integral spins, such as 3 for 10B and 1 for 14N. Values of nuclear spin for a given isotope are found in the lists of isotopes for each element. (See Isotopes of oxygen, Isotopes of aluminium, etc. etc.)

See also 
 Total angular momentum quantum number
 Rotational spectroscopy
 Basic quantum mechanics

References

External links 
 

Atomic physics
Rotation in three dimensions
Rotational symmetry
Quantum numbers
Quantum models